A population decline (also sometimes called underpopulation, depopulation, or population collapse) in humans is a reduction in a human population size. Over the long term, stretching from prehistory to the present, Earth's total human population has continued to grow; however, current projections suggest that this long-term trend of steady population growth may be coming to an end.

Until the beginning of the Industrial Revolution, the global population grew very slowly, at about 0.04% per year.  After about 1800, the growth rate accelerated to a peak of 2.1% annually during the 1962–1968 period, but since then, due to the worldwide collapse of the total fertility rate, it has slowed to 0.9% as of 2023. The global growth rate in absolute numbers accelerated to a peak of 92.8 million in 1990, but slowed to 80.0 million in 2019. 

Long-term projections indicate that the growth rate of the human population of this planet will continue to slow down and that before the end of the 21st century, it will reach zero. Examples of this emerging trend are Japan, whose population is currently (2022–2026) declining at the rate of 0.5% per year, and China, whose population has peaked and is currently (2022 – 2026) declining at the rate of about 0.04%. By 2050, Europe's population is projected to be declining at the rate of 0.3% per year.

Population growth has declined mainly due to the abrupt decline in the global total fertility rate, from 5.3 in 1963 to 2.4 in 2019.  The decline in the total fertility rate has occurred in every region of the world and is a result of a process known as demographic transition. To maintain its population, ignoring migration, a country requires a minimum fertility rate of 2.1 children per woman (the number is slightly greater than 2 because not all children live to adulthood). However, almost all societies experience a drastic drop in fertility to well below 2 as they grow more wealthy (see income and fertility). The tendency of women in wealthier countries to have fewer children is attributed to a variety of reasons, such as lower infant mortality and a reduced need for children as a source of family labor or retirement welfare, both of which reduce the incentive to have many children. Better access to education for young women, which broadens their job prospects, is also often cited.

Possible consequences of long-term national population decline can be net positive or negative. If a country can increase its workforce productivity faster than its population is declining, the results, in terms of its economy, the quality of life of its citizens, and the environment, can be net positive. If it cannot increase workforce productivity faster than its population's decline, the results can be negative.

National efforts to confront a declining population to date have been focused on the possible negative economic consequences and have been centered on increasing the size and productivity of the workforce.

Causes
A reduction over time in a region's population can be caused by sudden adverse events such as outbursts of infectious disease, famine, and war or by long-term trends, for example, sub-replacement fertility, persistently low birth rates, high mortality rates, and continued emigration.

Short-term population shocks
Historical episodes of short-term human population decline have been common and have been caused by several factors.

 High death rates caused by disease, for example, the Black Death that devastated Europe in the 14th and 17th centuries, the arrival of Old World diseases in the Americas during European colonization, and the Spanish flu pandemic after World War I,
 Famine, for example, the Great Irish Famine of the 19th century, and the Great Chinese Famine caused by the Great Leap Forward which caused tens of millions of deaths
 War, for example, the Mongol invasion of Europe in the 13th century, which may have reduced the population of Hungary by 20–40%,
 Civil unrest, for example, the forced migration of the population of Syria because of the Syrian Civil War

Less frequently, short-term population declines are caused by genocide or mass execution. For example, it has been estimated that the Armenian genocide caused 1.5 million deaths, the Jewish Holocaust about 6 million, and, in the 1970s, the population of Cambodia declined because of wide-scale executions by the Khmer Rouge.

In modern times, the AIDS pandemic and the COVID-19 pandemic have caused short-term drops in fertility and significant excess mortality in a number of countries.

Some population declines result from indeterminate causes, for example, the Bronze Age Collapse, which has been described as the worst disaster in ancient history.

Long-term historic trends in world population growth 

In spite of these short-term population shocks, world population has continued to grow. From around 10,000 BC to the beginning of the Early modern period (generally 1500 – 1800), world population grew very slowly, around 0.04% per year. During that period, population growth was governed by conditions now labeled the “Malthusian Trap”.

After 1700, driven by increases in human productivity due to the Industrial Revolution, particularly the increase in agricultural productivity, population growth accelerated to around 0.6% per year, a rate that was over ten times the rate of population growth of the previous 12,000 years. This rapid increase in global population caused Malthus and others to raise the first concerns about overpopulation.

After World War I birth rates in the United States and many European countries fell below replacement level. This prompted concern about population decline. The recovery of the birth rate in most western countries around 1940 that produced the "baby boom", with annual growth rates in the 1.0 – 1.5% range, and which peaked during the period 1962 -1968 at 2.1% per year, temporarily dispelled prior concerns about population decline, and the world was once again fearful of overpopulation.

But after 1968 the global population growth rate started a long decline, and in the period 2022–2027 the UN estimates it to be about 0.9%,  less than half of its peak during the period 1962 - 1968. Although still growing, the UN predicts that global population will level out around 2086, and some sources predict the start of a decline before then. The principal cause of this phenomenon is the abrupt decline in the global total fertility rate, from 5.3 in 1963 to 2.4 in 2019. The decline in the total fertility rate has occurred in every region of the world and has brought renewed concern from some for population decline.

The era of rapid global population increase, and concomitant concern about a population explosion, has been short compared with the span of human history. It began roughly at the beginning of the industrial revolution and appears to be now drawing to a close.

Possible consequences

Predictions of the net economic (and other) effects from a slow and continuous population decline (e.g. due to low fertility rates) are mainly theoretical since such a phenomenon is a relatively new and unprecedented one. The results of many of these studies show that the estimated impact of population growth on economic growth is generally small and can be positive, negative, or nonexistent. A recent meta-study found no relationship between population growth and economic growth.

Possible positive effects 
The effects of a declining population can be positive. The single best gauge of economic success is the growth of GDP per person, not total GDP. GDP per person (also known as GDP per capita or per capita GDP) is a rough proxy for average living standards. A country can both increase its average living standard and grow its total GDP even though its population growth is low or even negative. The economies of both Japan and Germany went into recovery around the time their populations began to decline (2003–2006). In other words, both the total and per capita GDP in both countries grew more rapidly after 2005 than before. Russia's economy also began to grow rapidly from 1999 onward, even though its population had been shrinking since 1992–93. Many Eastern European countries have been experiencing similar effects to Russia. Such renewed growth calls into question the conventional wisdom that economic growth requires population growth, or that economic growth is impossible during a population decline.

More recently (2009–2017) Japan has experienced a higher growth of GDP per capita than the United States, even though its population declined over that period. In the United States, the relationship between population growth and growth of GDP per capita has been found to be empirically insignificant. This evidence shows that individual prosperity can grow during periods of population decline.

Attempting to better understand the economic impact of these pluses and minuses, Lee et al. analyzed data from 40 countries. They found that typically fertility well above replacement and population growth would be most beneficial for government budgets. Fertility near replacement and population stability, however, would be most beneficial for standards of living when the analysis includes the effects of age structure on families as well as governments. Fertility moderately below replacement and population decline would maximize per capita consumption when the cost of providing capital for a growing labor force is taken into account.

A focus on productivity growth that leads to an increase in both per capita GDP and total GDP can bring other benefits to:

the workforce through higher wages, benefits and better working conditions
customers through lower prices
owners and shareholders through higher profits
the environment through more money for investment in more stringent environmental protection
governments through higher tax proceeds to fund government activities

Another approach to possible positive effects of population decline is to consider Earth's carrying capacity. Global population decline would begin to counteract the negative effects of human overpopulation. The human carrying capacity of the Earth has been estimated to be 500 million, 1 billion or up to 12 billion. According to these studies, the human carrying capacity has already been exceeded or would be exceeded by the year 2100. The large variance in these studies’ estimates diminishes our confidence in them, as such estimates are very difficult to make with current data and methods.

Possible negative effects 
The effects of a declining population can also be negative. As a country's population declines, GDP growth may grow even more slowly or may even decline. If the decline in total population is not matched by an equal or greater increase in productivity (GDP/capita), and if that condition continues from one calendar quarter to the next, it follows that a country would experience a decline in GDP, known as an economic recession.  If these conditions become permanent, the country could find itself in a permanent recession.

Other possible negative impacts of a declining population are:

 A rise in the dependency ratio which would increase the economic pressure on the workforce
 A loss of culture and the diminishment of trust among citizens
 A crisis in end-of-life care for the elderly because there are insufficient caregivers for them
 Difficulties in funding entitlement programs because there are fewer workers relative to retirees
 A decline in military strength
 A decline in innovation since change comes from the young
 A strain on mental health caused by permanent recession
 Deflation caused by the ageing population

All these negative effects could be summarized under the heading of “Underpopulation”.  Underpopulation is usually defined as a state in which a country's population has declined too much to support its current economic system.

Population decline can cause internal population pressures that then lead to secondary effects such as ethnic conflict, forced refugee flows, and hyper-nationalism. This is particularly true in regions where different ethnic or racial groups have different growth rates.An example of this is white nationalism. White nationalists seek to ensure the survival of the white race, and the cultures of historically white nations. Many white nationalists believe that white people should therefore maintain a demographic majority and that mass immigration of non-whites and low birth rates among whites are threatening the white race. Low fertility rates that cause long-term population decline can also lead to population ageing, an imbalance in the population age structure. Population ageing in Europe due to low fertility rates has given rise to concerns about its impact on social cohesion.

A smaller national population can also have geo-strategic effects, but the correlation between population and power is a tenuous one. Technology and resources often play more significant roles. Since World War II, the "static" theory saw a population's absolute size as being one of the components of a country's national power.More recently, the "human capital" theory has emerged. This view holds that the quality and skill level of a labor force and the technology and resources available to it are more important than simply a nation's population size.While there were in the past advantages to high fertility rates, that "demographic dividend" has now largely disappeared.

Contemporary decline by country

The table below shows the countries that have been affected by population decline between 2010 and 2020. The term "population" used here is based on the de facto definition of population, which counts all residents regardless of legal status or citizenship, except for refugees not permanently settled in the country of asylum, who are generally considered part of the population of the country of origin. This means that population growth in this table includes net changes from immigration and emigration. For a table of natural population changes, see the list of countries by natural increase.

East Asia

Japan

Though Japan's natural increase turned negative as early as 2005, the 2010 census result figure was slightly higher, at just above 128 million, than the 2005 census. Factors implicated in the puzzling figures were more Japanese returnees than expected as well as changes in the methodology of data collection. However, the official count put the population as of October 1, 2015, at 127.1 million, down by 947,000 or 0.7% from the previous quinquennial census. The gender ratio is increasingly skewed; some 106 women per 100 men live in Japan. In 2019, Japan's population fell by a record-breaking 276,000; if immigration is excluded from the figures, the drop would have been 487,000. Given the population boom of the 1950s and 1960s, the total population is still 52% above 1950 levels.

South Korea

South Korea's total fertility rate has been consistently lower than that of Japan, breaking below 1 in 2018, and fell to 0.81 in 2021. As a result, its population fell in 2020 for the first time in the country's history.

Taiwan

Taiwan recorded more deaths than births in the first quarter of 2021, despite recording virtually no COVID-19 deaths, likely to continue as a long-term demographic trend.

Eastern Europe and former Soviet republics

Population in the ex-USSR and Eastern Europe is rapidly shrinking due to low birth rates, very high death rates (linked to alcoholism and high rates of infectious diseases such as AIDS and TB), as well as high emigration rates. In Russia and the former communist bloc, birth rates fell abruptly after the fall of the Soviet Union, and death rates generally rose sharply. In addition, in the 25 years after 1989, some 20 million people from Eastern Europe are estimated to have migrated to Western Europe or the United States.

Armenia
Armenia's population peaked at 3,604,000 in 1991 and declined to 3,010,600 in the January 2015 state statistical estimate. This represents a 19.7% decrease in the total population since the peak census figure.

Belarus
Belarus's population peaked at 10,151,806 in the 1989 Census and declined to 9,480,868 as of 2015 as estimated by the state statistical service. This represents a 7.1% decline since the peak census figure.

Estonia
In the last Soviet census of 1989, it had a population of 1,565,662, which was close to its peak population. The state statistics reported an estimate of 1,314,370 for 2016. This represents a 19.2% decline since the peak census figure.

Georgia
In the last Soviet census of 1989, it had a population of 5,400,841, which was close to its peak population. The state statistics reported an estimate of 4,010,000 for the 2014 Census, which includes estimated numbers for quasi-independent Abkhazia and South Ossetia. This represents a 25.7% decline since the peak census figure, but nevertheless somewhat higher than the 1950 population.

Latvia
When Latvia split from the Soviet Union, it had a population of 2,666,567, which was very close to its peak population. The latest census recorded a population of 2,067,887 in 2011, while the state statistics reported an estimate of 1,986,086 for 2015. This represents a 25.5% decline since the peak census figure, with only one of two nations worldwide falling below 1950 levels. The decline is caused by both a negative natural population growth (more deaths than births) and a negative net migration rate.

Lithuania
When Lithuania split from the Soviet Union, it had a population of 3.7 million, which was close to its peak population. The latest census recorded a population of 3.05 million in 2011, down from 3.4 million in 2001, further falling to 2,988,000 on September 1, 2012.
This represents a 23.8% decline since the peak census figure, and some 13.7% since 2001.

Ukraine
Ukraine census in 1989 resulted in 51,452,034 people. Ukraine's own estimates show a peak of 52,244,000 people in 1993; however, this number has plummeted to 45,439,822 as of December 1, 2013. Having lost Crimean territory to Russia in early 2014 and subsequently experiencing war, the population dropped to 42,981,850 as of August 2014. This represents a 19.7% decrease in total population since the peak figure, but 16.8% above the 1950 population even without Crimea. Its absolute total decline (9,263,000) since its peak population is the highest of all nations; this includes loss of territory and heavy net emigration. Eastern Ukraine may yet lose many Russian-speaking citizens due to the new Russian citizenship law. An editorial projects significant gender and age imbalance in the population in Ukraine as a substantial problem if most refugees, as in other cases, do not return over time. Approximately 3.8 million more people have left the country during the 2022 Russian invasion of Ukraine, and several thousand have died in the conflict.

Hungary
Hungary's population peaked in 1980, at 10,709,000, and has continued its decline to under 10 million as of August 2010. This represents a decline of 7.1% since its peak; however, compared to neighbors situated to the East, Hungary peaked almost a decade earlier yet the rate has been far more modest, averaging −0.23% a year over the period.

Balkans

Albania
Albania's population in 1989 recorded 3,182,417 people, the largest for any census. Since then, its population declined to an estimated 2,893,005 in January 2015. The decline has since accelerated with a 1.3% drop in population reported in 2021 leaving a total population of 2.79 million. This represents a decrease of 12% in total population since the peak census figure.

Bosnia and Herzegovina
Bosnia and Herzegovina's population peaked at 4,377,033 in the 1991 Census, shortly before the Yugoslav wars that produced tens of thousands of civilian victims and refugees. The latest census of 2016 reported a population of 3,511,372. This represents a 19.8% decline since the peak census figure.

Bulgaria

Bulgaria's population declined from a peak of 9,009,018 in 1989 and since 2001, has lost yet another 600,000 people, according to 2011 census preliminary figures to no more than 7.3 million, further down to 7,245,000. This represents a 24.3% decrease in total population since the peak and a −0.82% annual rate in the last 10 years.

The Bulgarian population has fallen by more than 844,000 people, or 11.5 percent, in the last decade, the National Institute of Statistics in Sofia said during a presentation of the results so far of the 2021 census, the first since 2011.

The country currently employs just over 6.5 million people, compared to 7.3 million in the previous workforce.

Croatia
Croatia's population declined from 4,784,265 in 1991 to 4,456,096 (by the old statistical method) of which 4,284,889 are permanent residents (by the new statistical method), in 2011, a decline of 8% (11.5% by the new definition of permanent residency in 2011 census). The main reasons for the decline since 1991 are: low birth rates, emigration and war in Croatia. From 2001 and 2011 main reason for the drop in population is due to a difference in the definition of permanent residency used in censuses till 2001 (censuses of 1948, 1953, 1961, 1971, 1981, 1991 and 2001) and the one used in 2011. By 2021 the population dropped to 3,888,529, a 9,25% decrease from 2011 numbers.

Greece
Greece's population declined by about half a million people between its 2011 and 2021 censuses. The main drivers are increased emigration rates and lower birth rates following the 2007–2008 financial crisis.

Romania
Romania's 1991 census showed 23,185,084 people, and the October 2011 census recorded 20,121,641 people, while the state statistical estimate for 2014 is 19,947,311. This represents a decrease of 16.2% since the historical peak in 1991.

Serbia
Serbia recorded a peak census population of 7,576,837 in 1991 in the Yugoslav era, falling to 7,186,862 in the 2011 census. That represents a decline of 5.1% since its peak census figure.

Resumed declines
Countries whose population declines halted temporarily, but have since resumed:

Russia 

The decline in Russia's total population is among the largest in numbers, but not in percentage. After having peaked at 148,689,000 in 1991, the population then decreased, falling to 142,737,196 by 2008. This represents a 4.0% decrease in total population since the peak census figure. However, since then the Russian population has risen to 146,870,000 in 2018. This recent trend can be attributed to a lower death rate, higher birth rate, the annexation of Crimea and continued immigration, mostly from Ukraine and Armenia. It is some 40% above the 1950 population. Russia has become increasingly reliant on immigration to maintain its population; 2021 had the highest net immigration since 1994, despite which there was a small overall decline from 146.1 million to 145.4 million in 2021, the largest decline in over a decade. The natural death rate in January 2020, 2021, and 2022 have each been nearly double the natural birth rate.

Spain 
Spanish population fell by over 100 thousand in 2020, likely to continue as a long-term demographic trend.

Italy 
Italian population fell by a record amount in 2020, likely to continue as a long-term demographic trend.

Portugal 
Between 2011 and 2021, Portugal's population declined from 10.56 to 10.34 million people. The fertility rate has been consistently below 2 since the early 1980s, and the gap is increasingly being made up by Brazilian immigrants.

Halted declines

Germany 
In Germany, a continuously low birth rate has been offset by waves of immigration. From 2002 to 2011 the population declined by 2 million, the most since the Cold War. The 2011 national census recorded a population of 80.2 million people, following which official estimates showed an increase of 3 million over the next decade. The official estimate for 2020 was a slight decrease from 2019. Third-party estimates show a slight increase, instead.

Ireland 
In the current area of the Republic of Ireland, the population has fluctuated dramatically. The population of Ireland was 8 million in 1841, but it dropped due to the Irish famine and later emigration. The population of the Republic of Ireland hit a bottom at 2.8 million in the 1961 census, but it then rose and in 2011 it was 4.58 million. As of 2020, it is estimated to be just under 5 million according to the country's Central Statistics Office.

Poland  
The Population of Poland in the last 20 years has caused many years of recorded growth and decline with the population. The recorded population of Poland between 2002-2006 had shown a decreasing trend while between 2007 and 2012 the population had an increasing trend. Though since 2020, Covid 19 has started to cause the population to decline rapidly, with over 117,000 people reportedly dying from covid 19 in Poland by October 2022. Poland also saw a large number of Ukrainian Refugees move into Poland, with over 7.8 million people having crossed the border by October 2022 between Poland and Ukraine since the war began, of which 1.4 million have stayed in Poland.

Syria 
Syria's population declined during the period 2012 - 2018  due to an ongoing civil war. During that period many Syrians emigrated to other Middle eastern countries. The civil war makes an accurate count of the Syrian population difficult, but the UN estimates that it peaked in 2012 at 22.9 million and dropped to 18.9 million in 2018, a decline of 17%. Since then Syria’s population has resumed growing, and the UN projects that by 2025 it will have reached 24.9 million

Declines within regions or ethnic groups of a country

United States

In spite of a growing population at a national level, some formerly large American municipalities have dramatically shrunk after the Second World War, and in particular during the 1950s–1970s, due to suburbanization, urban decay, race riots, high crime rates, deindustrialization and emigration from the Rust Belt to the Sun Belt. For instance, Detroit's population peaked at almost 2 million in 1953, and then declined to less than 700,000 by 2020. Other cities whose populations have dramatically shrunk since the 1950s include Baltimore, Buffalo, Cincinnati, Cleveland, Flint, Gary, New Orleans, St. Louis, Pittsburgh, Scranton, Youngstown and Wilmington (Delaware). In addition, the depopulation of the Great Plains, caused by a very high rate of rural flight from isolated agricultural counties, has been going on since the 1930s.

In addition, starting from the 1950s, the United States has witnessed the phenomenon of the white flight or white exodus, the large-scale migration of people of various European ancestries from racially mixed urban regions to more racially homogeneous suburban or exurban regions. The term has more recently been applied to other migrations by whites, from older, inner suburbs to rural areas, as well as from the U.S. Northeast and Midwest to the warmer climate in the Southeast and Southwest. Migration of middle-class white populations was observed during the Civil rights movement in the 1950s and 1960s out of cities such as Cleveland, Detroit, Kansas City and Oakland, although racial segregation of public schools had ended there long before the Supreme Court of the United States' decision Brown v. Board of Education in 1954. In the 1970s, attempts to achieve effective desegregation (or "integration") using forced busing in some areas led to more families moving out of former areas. More recently, as of 2018, California had the largest ethnic/racial minority population in the United States; Non-Hispanic whites decreased from about 76.3 – 78% of the state's population in 1970 to 36.6%% in 2018 and 39.3% of the total population was Hispanic-Latino (of any race).

A combination of long-term trends, housing affordability, falling birthrates and rising death rates from the COVID-19 pandemic have caused as many as 16 US states to start declining in population.

France

The term 'Empty diagonal' is used for French departments that have low or declining populations. Due to continued emigration, many departments in France are seeing declines in population, including: Aisne, Allier, Ardennes, Cantal, Charente, Cher, Corrèze, Creuse, Dordogne, Eure, Eure-et-Loir, Haute-Marne, Haute-Saône, Haute-Vienne, Indre, Jura, Loir-et-Cher, Lot-et-Garonne, Lozère, Manche, Marne, Mayenne, Meuse, Moselle, Nièvre, Orne, Paris, Sarthe, Somme, Territoire de Belfort, Vosges and Yonne. For more information, see the List of French departments by population.

South Africa

The term 'white flight' has also been used for large-scale post-colonial emigration of whites from Africa, or parts of that continent, driven by levels of violent crime and anti-colonial state policies.In recent decades, there has been a steady and proportional decline in South Africa's white community, due to higher birth rates among other South African ethnic groups, as well as a high rate of emigration. In 1977, there were 4.3 million White South Africans, constituting 16.4% of the population at the time. An estimated 800,000 emigrated between 1995 and 2016, citing crime and a lack of employment opportunities.

India 
The Parsis of India have one of the lowest fertility rates in the world (0.8 children per woman in 2017); this coupled with emigration has resulted in population decline at least since the 1940s. Their population has more than halved from its peak.

National efforts to confront declining populations

A country with a declining population will struggle to fund public services such as health care, old age benefits, defense, education, water and sewage infrastructure, etc. To maintain some level of economic growth and continue to improve its citizens’ quality of life, national efforts to confront declining populations will tend to focus on the threat of a declining GDP. Because a country's GDP is dependent on the size and productivity of its workforce, a country confronted with a declining population, will focus on increasing the size and productivity of that workforce.

Increase the size of the workforce 
A country's workforce is that segment of its working-age population that is employed. Working age population is generally defined as those people aged 15–64.

Policies that could increase the size of the workforce include:

 Natalism

Natalism is a set of government policies and cultural changes that promote parenthood and encourage women to bear more children. These generally fall into three broad categories:

 Financial incentives. These may include child benefits and other public transfers that help families cover the cost of children.
 Support for parents to combine family and work. This includes maternity-leave policies, parental-leave policies that grant (by law) leaves of absence from work to care for their children, and childcare services.
 Broad social change that encourages children and parenting

For example, Sweden built up an extensive welfare state from the 1930s and onward, partly as a consequence of the debate following "Crisis in the Population Question", published in 1934. Today, (2017) Sweden has extensive parental leave that allows parents to share 16 months of paid leave per child, the cost divided between both employer and State.

Other examples include Romania's natalist policy during the 1967–90 period and Poland's 500+ program.

 Encourage more women to join the workforce. 

Encouraging those women in the working-age population who are not working to find jobs would increase the size of the workforce. Female participation in the workforce currently (2018) lags men's in all but three countries worldwide.Among developed countries, the workforce participation gap between men and women can be especially wide. For example, currently (2018), in South Korea 59% of women work compared with 79% of men.

However, even assuming that more women would want to join the workforce, increasing their participation would give these countries only a short-term increase in their workforce, because at some point a participation ceiling is reached, further increases are not possible, and the impact on GDP growth ceases.

 Stop the decline of men in the workforce.

In the United States, the labor force participation of men has been falling since the late 1960s. The labor force participation rate is the ratio between the size of the workforce and the size of the working-age population. In 1969 the labor force participation rate of men in their prime years of 25–54 was 96% and in 2015 was under 89%.
 Raise the retirement age.
Raising the retirement age has the effect of increasing the working-age population, but raising the retirement age requires other policy and cultural changes if it is to have any impact on the size of the workforce:

 Pension reform. Many retirement policies encourage early retirement. For example, in 2018 less than 10% of Europeans between ages 64–74 were employed. Instead of encouraging work after retirement, many public pension plans restrict earnings or hours of work.
 Workplace cultural reform. Employer attitudes towards older workers must change. Extending working lives will require investment in training and working conditions to maintain the productivity of older workers.

One study estimated that increasing the retirement age by 2–3 years per decade between 2010 and 2050 would offset declining working-age populations faced by "old" countries such as Germany and Japan.
 Increase immigration. 
A country can increase the size of its workforce by importing more migrants into their working age population. Even if the indigenous workforce is declining, qualified immigrants can reduce or even reverse this decline. However, this policy can only work if the immigrants can join the workforce and if the indigenous population accepts them.

For example, starting in 2019 Japan, a country with a declining workforce, will allow five-year visas for 250,000 unskilled guest workers. Under the new measure, between 260,000 and 345,000 five-year visas will be made available for workers in 14 sectors suffering severe labor shortages, including caregiving, construction, agriculture and shipbuilding.

 Reduce emigration.

The table above shows that long-term persistent emigration, often caused by what is called "Brain Drain", is often one of the major causes of a county's population decline. However, research has also found that emigration can have net positive effects on sending countries, so this would argue against any attempts to reduce it.

Increase the productivity of the workforce 

Development economists would call increasing the size of the workforce "extensive growth". They would call increasing the productivity of that workforce "intensive growth". In this case, GDP growth is driven by increased output per worker, and by extension, increased GDP/capita.

In the context of a stable or declining population, increasing workforce productivity is better than mostly short-term efforts to increase the size of the workforce. Economic theory predicts that in the long term, most growth will be attributable to intensive growth, that is, new technology and new and better ways of doing things plus the addition of capital and education to spread them to the workforce.

Increasing workforce productivity through intensive growth can only succeed if workers who become unemployed through the introduction of new technology can be retrained so that they can keep their skills current and not be left behind. Otherwise, the result is technological unemployment. Funding for worker retraining could come from a robot tax, although the idea is controversial.

Compared to 1800s 
Only two nations today, globally have a population similar to the 19th century, or 1800s, Bulgaria and Ireland, both having seen emigration.

Long-term future trends

A long-term population decline is typically caused by sub-replacement fertility, coupled with a net immigration rate that fails to compensate for the excess of deaths over births. A long-term decline is accompanied by population aging and creates an increase in the ratio of retirees to workers and children. When a sub-replacement fertility rate remains constant, population decline accelerates over the long term.

Because of the global decline in the fertility rate, projections of future global population show a marked slowing of population growth and the possibility of long-term decline.

The table below summarizes the United Nations projections for future population growth. Any such long-term projections are necessarily highly speculative. The UN divides the world into six regions. Under their projections, during the period 2045–2050, Europe's population will be in decline and all other regions will experience significant reductions in growth; then, by the end of the 21st century (the period 2095–2100) three of these regions will be showing population decline and global population will have peaked and started to decline.

Note: the UN's methods for generating these numbers are explained at this reference.

The table shows that the UN predicts long-term decline of population growth rates in every region; however, short-term baby booms and healthcare improvements, among other factors, can cause reversals of trends. Population declines in the Russia Federation (1994–2008), Germany (1974–1984), and Ireland (1850–1961) have seen long-term reversals.The UK, having seen almost zero growth during the period 1975–1985, is now (2015–2020) growing at 0.6% per year.

See also

 Biodiversity loss
 Birth dearth
 Societal collapse
 Negative Population Growth
 History of Easter Island#Destruction of society and population
 Human overpopulation
 Human population planning
 Political demography
 Population cycle
 Population growth
 Rural flight
 Sub-replacement fertility
 Zero population growth
 Church of Euthanasia
 Antinatalism
 Human extinction

Case studies:
 Russian Cross
 Ageing of Europe
 Aging of the United States
 Aging of Japan
 List of sovereign states and dependencies by total fertility rate
 Empty diagonal

References

Further reading

Funabashi, Yoichi. Japan’s Population Implosion: The 50 Million Shock (Palgrave Macmillan, 2018). 
Yoshikawa, Hiroshi. Population and the Japanese Economy: Longevity, Innovation, and Economic Growth (Japan Publishing Industry Foundation for Culture, 2020). 

Aftermath of war
Ageing
Demographic economic problems